Thai AirAsia X is a Thai long-haul low-fare airline based at Suvarnabhumi Airport in Bangkok. It is a joint venture of AirAsia X from Malaysia and Thai AirAsia.

History
On 18 September 2013 AirAsia X signed a shareholders agreement with Tassapon Bijleveld and Julpas Krueospon to establish a joint venture co-operation for a long-haul low-cost airline, a Thai company named Thai AirAsia X Company Limited was started in which AirAsia took a 49% share. Thai AirAsia X is the medium and long-haul operation of the brand Thai AirAsia. The franchise can keep costs down by using a common ticketing system, aircraft livery, employee uniforms, and management style.

On 3 February 2014 Thai AirAsia X received an Air Operators Certificate from the Department of Civil Aviation of Thailand which allowed the airline to apply for permits and slots for the intended routes. Thai AirAsia X launched its first destination to Seoul/Incheon on 17 June 2014 by an Airbus A330-300 from Bangkok-Don Mueang. Following destinations were Osaka Kansai and Tokyo Narita on 1 September 2014.

In December 2016, Thai AirAsia X announced the end of services to the Middle East by subsequently cancelling all flights to Tehran and Muscat.

In August 2019, Thai AirAsia X took delivery of its first Airbus A330neo aircraft.

Due to lockdown measures, all domestic flights in July 2021 were canceled. In October 2021, Thai Asia X announced the resumption of flights at Suvarnabhumi Airport for the next month.

On 26 April 2022 Thai AirAsia X announced that it would be moving its operations from Don Mueang International Airport to Suvarnabhumi Airport. On 19 May 2022 Thai AirAsia X filed for bankruptcy with the Central Bankruptcy Court in Bangkok, however the process would have no impact on passengers, as operations continue as usual.

Destinations

, Thai AirAsia X operates or has previously operated to the following destinations:

Fleet

, Thai AirAsia X operates the following aircraft:

See also
 AirAsia
 AirAsia X
 Thai AirAsia
 Tune Ventures
 Transport in Thailand

References

External links

 Official website

Low-cost carriers
AirAsia
Airlines of Thailand
Airlines established in 2014
Thai companies established in 2014
Companies that filed for Chapter 11 bankruptcy in 2022